= Lampacito =

Coordinates: 26.7169°S 66.0761°W

- Municipality and village
- Interactive map of Lampacito
- Country: Argentina
- Province: Catamarca Province
- Time zone: UTC−3 (ART)

Lampacito is a village and municipality in Catamarca Province in northwestern Argentina.
